Diario Democráticamente is a newspaper published in Paraguay.

Newspapers published in Paraguay